Volodymyr Pavlovych Dmytrenko (born 23 July 1995) is a Ukrainian professional footballer who plays as a right-back for Obolon Kyiv.

Career
Dmytrenko is a product of the FC Skhid Kyiv and FC Metalist Kharkiv Youth Sportive Schools. His first trainer was Oleksandr Hrebenozhko (in Skhid Kyiv).

He spent his career as a player for FC Metalist, SC Tavriya, FC Dynamo Kyiv in the Ukrainian Premier League Reserves and after for FC Dynamo-2, FC Veres and FC Arsenal Kyiv in the Ukrainian First League.

References

External links
 
 
 

1995 births
Living people
Footballers from Kyiv
Ukrainian footballers
Association football midfielders
FC Metalist Kharkiv players
SC Tavriya Simferopol players
FC Bukovyna Chernivtsi players
FC Dynamo Kyiv players
FC Dynamo-2 Kyiv players
NK Veres Rivne players
FC Arsenal Kyiv players
FC Nyva Vinnytsia players
Alki Oroklini players
FC Dinaz Vyshhorod players
FC Olimpik Donetsk players
FC Obolon-Brovar Kyiv players
Ukrainian First League players
Ukrainian Second League players
Cypriot Second Division players
Ukrainian expatriate footballers
Expatriate footballers in Cyprus
Ukrainian expatriate sportspeople in Cyprus